Siraj Nassar (born 2 September 1990) is an Arab-Israeli football midfielder who plays for Shimshon Kafr Qasim.

External links

Living people
1990 births
Israeli footballers
Arab-Israeli footballers
Arab citizens of Israel
Israeli Arab Christians
Maccabi Kafr Kanna F.C. players
Hapoel Be'er Sheva F.C. players
Hapoel Tel Aviv F.C. players
Bnei Sakhnin F.C. players
FK Kukësi players
Hapoel Acre F.C. players
Shimshon Kafr Qasim F.C. players
Israeli Premier League players
Kategoria Superiore players
Expatriate footballers in Albania
Israeli expatriate sportspeople in Albania
Footballers from Northern District (Israel)
Association football midfielders